Withholding Pattern is a solo album by English saxophonist John Surman, released on the ECM label in 1985.

Reception
Allmusic awarded the album 4 stars and its review by Ron Wynn states: "Saxophone workout from '85 by outstanding British player John Surman. While solo sax can be extremely tiring, Surman mixes enough elements of rock, free, blues, and hard bop to keep the songs varied. His aggressive style, especially on baritone, keeps the energy level high."

Track listing
All compositions by John Surman.

"Doxology" – 6:02
"Changes of Season" – 9:30
"All Cat's Whiskers and Bee's Knees" – 2:59
"Holding Pattern I" – 5:02
"Skating on Thin Ice" – 4:53
"The Snooper" – 1:59
"Wildcat Blues" – 3:48
"Holding Pattern II" – 8:17

Personnel
John Surman – baritone and soprano saxophones, bass clarinet, recorder, piano, synthesizer

References

1985 albums
ECM Records albums
John Surman albums
Albums produced by Manfred Eicher